A print room is either a room or industrial building where printing takes place, or a room in an art gallery or museum.

Print Room may also refer to:
 Print Room, Windsor, at Windsor Castle
 Print Room (theatre), an Off West End theatre located in the former Coronet Cinema in London